Dithietanes are saturated heterocyclic compounds that contain two divalent sulfur atoms and two sp3-hybridized carbon centers. Two isomers are possible for this class of organosulfur compounds:

1,2-Dithietanes 
1,2-dithietanes, 4-membered rings where the two sulfur atoms are adjacent, are very rare.  The first stable 1,2-dithietane to be reported was the so-called dithiatopazine formed by intramolecular photodimerization of a dithiocarbonyl compound. 1,2-Dithietanes are to be distinguished from 1,2-dithietes, containing two adjacent sulfur atoms and two sp2-hybridized carbon centers.

A stable 1,2-dithietane derivative is trans-3,4-diethyl-1,2-dithietane 1,1-dioxide, formed by the spontaneous dimerization of the lachrymatory agent syn-propanethial-S-oxide, found in onion.

1,3-Dithietanes 
In 1,3-dithietanes, the sulfur atoms are non-adjacent. 1,3-Dithietane itself, a colorless, easily sublimed, crystalline, unpleasant-smelling solid with melting point 105-106 °C, was first prepared in 1976 by reaction of bis(chloromethyl) sulfoxide with sodium sulfide followed by THF-borane reduction of the first formed 1,3-dithietane 1-oxide, as shown in the scheme below. Carbon-substituted 1,3-dithietanes are well known, with the first examples being described as early as 1872. Examples include 2,2,4,4-tetrachloro-1,3-dithietane, the photochemically-formed dimer of thiophosgene, and tetrakis(trifluoromethyl)-1,3-dithietane, [(CF3)2CS]2.

Oxidized forms of 1,3-dithietane are well known, although they are often not prepared from the dithietane. Examples include the so-called zwiebelanes (2,3-dimethyl-5,6-dithiabicyclo[2.1.1]hexane S-oxides) from onion volatiles and 1,3-dithietane 1,1,3,3-tetraoxide, the so-called sulfene dimer.

References

Dithietanes